Galina Yermolaevna Sergeyeva (February 1, 1914 – August 1, 2000) was a Soviet and Russian actress. Honored Artist of the RSFSR (1935).

From 1930, she was an actress at the Theatre-Studio led by Ruben Simonov. In 1939-1944 she was an actress of the Theatre of Leninsky Comsomol. In 1952-1956 she worked in the Vakhtangov Theatre in Moscow. She was the second wife of the famous Soviet opera singer Ivan Kozlovsky. They had two daughters.

Films
She played the main roles in the following films:
 "Pyshka" ("Пышка" - "The Puff-Girl", director Mikhail Romm 1934 - the role of Mademoiselle Bousse)
 "Lyubov Alyony" ("Любовь Алены" - "Alyona’s Love", 1934)
 "Vesennie dni" ("Весенние дни" - "The Spring Days", a comedy, 1934)
 "Myach i Serdse" ("Мяч и сердце" - "The Ball and the Heart") 1935
 "Gobsec" (1936)
 "Budni" ("Будни" - "Black-letter Days") - dramatic story, 1940)
 "Aktrisa" ("Актриса" - "Actress", dramatic story, 1943)

External links
 On Galina Sergeyeva 1
 On Galina Sergeyeva 2
 The family matters 1
 The family matters 2
 On film "Pyshka"
 On film "Aktrisa"
 

1914 births
2000 deaths
Burials in Troyekurovskoye Cemetery
Honored Artists of the RSFSR
Russian film actresses
Soviet film actresses
20th-century Russian women